George Harrison Burnside (January 21, 1899 – November 1, 1962) was a blocking back in the National Football League. He played with the Racine Tornadoes during the 1926 NFL season. He died on November 1, 1962, in Seattle.

References

External links

People from Oconto Falls, Wisconsin
Players of American football from Wisconsin
Racine Tornadoes players
American football quarterbacks
South Dakota Coyotes football players
Wisconsin Badgers football players
1899 births
1962 deaths